Kuwait participated in the 15th Asian Games, officially known as the XV Asiad held in Doha, Qatar from December 1 to December 15, 2006. Kuwait ranked 17th with 6 gold medals in this edition of the Asiad.

Medalists

References

Nations at the 2006 Asian Games
2006
Asian Games